The Oslo Metro is a rapid transit system serving Oslo and Bærum in Norway. The system is municipally-owned by Sporveien, and operated by its subsidiary Sporveien T-banen under contract to Ruter, the Oslo public transport authority. The metro has a daily ridership of 200,000, and serves 101 stations. The system consists of eight lines that operate as branches from the Common Tunnel—the shared section that runs  through the city center. In addition, the Ring Line operates in a loop north of the city center. There are six train services, numbered 1 through 6, that each operate from one branch via the city center to another branch or to the Ring Line. All services run every 15 minutes. Each branch has one service that operates to its terminus, except for the Lambertseter Line that has two.

The first part of the metro was the Holmenkollen Line, that opened as light rail in 1898. The Røa Line followed as a branch in 1912. The system became the first Nordic underground railway in 1928, when the underground line to Nationaltheatret was opened. The Østensjø Line opened in 1923, the Kolsås Line in 1924, and the Sognsvann Line in 1934. The Kolsås Line opened as an extension of the Lilleaker Line, but in 1942 it was connected to the Common Tunnel, while the rest of the Lilleaker Line remains as a light rail connected to the Oslo Tramway. The opening of the upgraded metro system in the eastern boroughs occurred in 1966, after the conversion of the 1957 Lambertseter Line to metro standard. It was followed by the conversion of the Østensjø Line, as well as the new Grorud Line and Furuset Line. In 1993, trains could, for the first time, run through the city between the two networks in the Common Tunnel. The latest extension is the 2006 opening of the Ring Line, that connects the eastern and western network north of the city center.

Parts of the system have been upgraded from light rail to metro standard. The Østensjø and Lambertseter Lines were converted in 1966, when the first sections of new metro line were opened. The Sognsvann and Røa Lines, as well as the western part of the Common Tunnel, were upgraded in 1993 and 1995. The Holmenkollen and Kolsås Lines were upgraded and subsequently re-opened in 2011 and 2014, respectively. Following the upgrade, all T1000 stock can be retired and replaced by the new MX3000 trains. The Grorud and Lambertseter Lines serve the Groruddalen valley while the Østensjø and Lambertseter Line serve the southern areas of Nordstrand. These four lines have the highest ridership. In the west, the Kolsås, Røa, Holmenkoll and Sognsvann Lines serves less densely populated areas. The Ring Line serves the northern borough of Nordre Aker, while the Common Tunnel serves the city center.

List

The following table presents the eleven lines of the Oslo Metro. They are chronologically sorted by the date of the first section of line to open. The service column indicates which of the six numbered services operates on most of the lines. Services are omitted from lines where they serve only one or two stations. The date indicates the official opening date of the line on the section noted in the fourth column. Sections with blue background indicate lines that were opened as tramways, while white background indicates the line was converted to or built as metro standard. The length column indicates the total length of the line at the time of opening or upgrade, and the extension column indicates the length of the extension. The station column indicates the number of stations on the line after the opening of each extension or upgrade. Unless specified otherwise, the lines are metro standard.

References

Notes

Bibliography